Karlo Ivančić (born 24 July 1994 in Zagreb, Croatia) is a Croatian footballer who plays for NK Razvitak.

Club career

Warriors FC
Tantalized by the prospect of playing abroad for the first time in his football career, Ivancic accepted an offer from Singaporean team Warriors FC to join their Prime League reserve squad, making his debut in a 2015 Singapore League Cup group stage clash opposing Tampines Rovers and providing an assist in the 1-0 triumph. Settling in fast, the Croatian then started 14 S.League games in a row, substituted off on four occasions. Positioned at a wide forward role during his time there, Ivancic expressed desire to be put in a central midfielder role to link the defense and attack.

TuS Kraubath
On 6 February 2019, Ivančić joined TuS Kraubath in Austria. He played 29 games for the club, before he left exactly one year later.

Dugo Selo
In February 2019, Ivančić joined NK Dugo Selo.

Jarun Zagreb
Ahead of the 2019-20 season, Ivančić moved to NK Jarun Zagreb.

HNK Daruvar
In 2020, Ivančić played for HNK Daruvar.

References

External links
Karlo Ivancic at Footballdatabase

1994 births
Living people
Footballers from Zagreb
Association football midfielders
Croatian footballers
NK Hrvatski Dragovoljac players
NK Vrapče players
NK Bistra players
Warriors FC players
NK Zagorec Krapina players
NK Krka players
Panargiakos F.C. players
First Football League (Croatia) players
Singapore Premier League players
Slovenian Second League players
Austrian 2. Landesliga players
Croatian expatriate footballers
Expatriate footballers in Singapore
Croatian expatriate sportspeople in Singapore
Expatriate footballers in Slovenia
Croatian expatriate sportspeople in Slovenia
Expatriate footballers in Greece
Croatian expatriate sportspeople in Greece
Expatriate footballers in Austria
Croatian expatriate sportspeople in Austria